Land of Make Believe is the third album by alternative hip hop group Kidz in the Hall, released on March 9, 2010. It is their second release on Duck Down Records. The first single released is "Take Over the World", which features producer Just Blaze and singer Colin Munroe.

Track listing

References

2010 albums
Duck Down Music albums
Kidz in the Hall albums
Albums produced by Double-O
Albums produced by Just Blaze